Juan Martín del Potro defeated the five-time defending champion Roger Federer in the final, 3–6, 7–6(7–5), 4–6, 7–6(7–4), 6–2 to win the men's singles tennis title at the 2009 US Open. He became the first Argentine man to win the title since Guillermo Vilas in 1977, and the first to win a major since Gastón Gaudio in the 2004 French Open. This was del Potro's only major title, although he would reach a second final in 2018. This was also the first US Open final since 1999 to go to five sets.

Federer was attempting to become the first man to win six consecutive US Open titles in the Open Era, and the first since Bill Tilden in 1925. He was also vying to become the first man to win the Surface Slam (winning majors on clay, grass and hard court in the same calendar year), having won the preceding French Open and Wimbledon. It was the only major not won by the Big Four between the 2005 Australian Open and the 2014 Australian Open, a span of 35 events. This remains the only major where Novak Djokovic, Federer, and Rafael Nadal all reached the semifinals, but none of them won the championship.

This was the first Major tournament since the 2006 Australian Open to have only one of Federer or Nadal as the top two seeds. Andy Murray was seeded second behind Federer after replacing Nadal as the world number two in the week beginning 17 August 2009. Nadal reclaimed the world number two ranking after Murray lost to Marin Čilić in the fourth round, therefore failing to defend his finalist points from 2008.

This tournament marked the final major appearance of former champion and world No. 1 Marat Safin.

For the first time in US Open history, no Americans reached the quarterfinals.

Seeds

Qualifying draw

Draw

Finals

Top half

Section 1

Section 2

Section 3

Section 4

Bottom half

Section 5

Section 6

Section 7

Section 8

References

External links
 Association of Tennis Professionals (ATP) – 2009 US Open Men's Singles draw
Qualifying Draw
2009 US Open – Men's draws and results at the International Tennis Federation

Men's Singles
US Open (tennis) by year – Men's singles